"Last Dance" is a song by American singer Donna Summer from the soundtrack album to the 1978 film Thank God It's Friday. It was written by Paul Jabara, co-produced by Summer's regular collaborator Giorgio Moroder and Pete Bellotte, and mixed by Grammy Award-winning producer Stephen Short, whose backing vocals are featured in the song.

"Last Dance" became a critical and commercial success, winning the Academy Award and Golden Globe Award for Best Original Song, the Grammy Award for Best Female R&B Vocal Performance, and peaked at number three on the Billboard Hot 100 chart, all in 1978.

Background and composition
Summer has a role in the film Thank God It's Friday as an aspiring singer who brings an instrumental track of "Last Dance" to a disco in hopes the disc jockey will play the track and allow her to sing the song for her fellow patrons; after refusing through most of the film the disc jockey eventually obliges Summer's character and her performance causes a sensation.

According to the song's arranger Bob Esty, Paul Jabara had locked Summer in a Puerto Rico hotel bathroom and forced her to listen to a cassette of him singing a rough version of "Last Dance". Summer liked the song and Jabara asked Esty to work with him on an arrangement for Summer to make her recording. Esty recalls: 

"Last Dance" was also one of the first disco songs to feature slow tempo parts: it starts off as a ballad; the full-length version on the film soundtrack also has a slow part in the middle. The middle part was edited out for the 7". Record World said of the single that "Its first half is a quiet ballad (which Summer sings well); it winds up with a hot, swirling disco finish." The versions found on most greatest hits packages is either the original 7" edit (3:21) or the slightly longer and remixed version from the 1979 compilation On The Radio: Greatest Hits Volumes 1 & 2 (4:56). "Last Dance" started a trend for Summer as some of her following hits also had a ballad-like intro before speeding up the tempo. On David Foster's "The Hitman Returns" DVD, David Foster introduces the song by relating a story to Donna Summer. When he played on the session in 1978, Foster thought the producer's suggestion to start the song as a ballad and change into a faster tempo was "the stupidest idea I've ever heard in my life, but we did it."

Awards and recognition
"Last Dance" won songwriter Paul Jabara a Grammy Award for Best Rhythm & Blues Song, an Academy Award, and a Golden Globe for Best Original Song that same year. The song won Donna Summer at the American Music Awards prizes for Favorite Disco Single and Favorite Female Disco Artist. She would also win the Grammy Award for Best R&B Vocal Performance, Female. With a #3 peak on the Hot 100 in Billboard magazine the week of August 12, 1978, "Last Dance" became Summer's third US Top Ten hit after "Love to Love You Baby" and "I Feel Love" and almost matched the #2 hit "Love to Love You Baby" as Summer's best-charting single (at that time). "Last Dance" also afforded Summer a #5 hit on the R&B charts, and was #1 on Billboard's Hot Disco Action Chart for six weeks eventually being ranked as the #1 Disco hit for the year 1978. Certified gold by the RIAA on July 19, 1978, for sales of a million units in the US,"Last Dance" marked a downturn in Summer's chart fortunes in the UK where she'd previously had more chart impact than in the US with "Last Dance"'s UK chart peak being at #51; Summer would return to the UK Top Ten - at #5 - with her follow-up single "MacArthur Park"  a single which afforded Summer her first US #1.
The song was ranked number 10 out of the top 76 songs of the 1970s by internet radio station WDDF Radio in their 2016 countdown.

Charts

Weekly charts

Year-end charts

Appearances in other media
 The song is frequently used by many radio stations as their last song before changing formats, being used by many "Jammin' Oldies" stations in the US before the downfall of the format early in the decade of the 2000s. It was also used as the last song on the SiriusXM channel The Strobe in October 2010. On June 6, 2016 at 12 p.m., classic hits station KOSF in San Francisco, California played "Last Dance" before flipping from "Big 103.7" to 1980s hits as "iHeart 80s at 103.7".

See also
List of number-one dance singles of 1978 (U.S.)

References

External links
 

1978 singles
Donna Summer songs
CeCe Peniston songs
Best Original Song Academy Award-winning songs
Best Original Song Golden Globe winning songs
Songs written by Paul Jabara
Casablanca Records singles
Song recordings produced by Giorgio Moroder
1978 songs
Songs about dancing
Disco songs